Private Resistance (and also released as The Ice-Cream Parlour) is a 1985 Dutch drama film directed by Dimitri Frenkel Frank. The plot revolves around Otto's ice cream parlor, a microcosm of the Nazi invasion, Fascist Dutch bullies and anti-fascist groups. The film was entered into the 14th Moscow International Film Festival.

Cast
 Gerard Thoolen as Otto Schneeweiss
 Bruno Ganz as Gustav
 Renée Soutendijk as Trudi
 Kees Hulst as Hans
 Carol van Herwijnen as Müller
 Gijs de Lange as Luuk
 Frits Lambrechts as NSB-partijbons
 Karin Bloemen as Carla
 Michiel Kerbosch as Brammetje
 Felix Jan Kuipers as Louis
 Alexander Van Heteren as Manteufel

References

External links
 

1985 films
1985 drama films
1980s Dutch-language films
Dutch drama films